Malmy is a commune in the Marne department in north-eastern France.

References

Communes of Marne (department)